Moses Kyeswa (born 12 April 1958) is a retired Ugandan sprinter who specialized in the 400 metres.

Kyeswa finished seventh in 4 x 400 metres relay at the 1984 Summer Olympics, together with teammates John Goville, Peter Rwamuhanda and Mike Okot, in a national record time of 3:02.09 minutes. 

On the individual level he participated in 400 m at the 1984 Olympics without reaching the final.  He reached the semifinals at the 1983 World Championships.  Based in Sweden, he won the Swedish championships in 1986, 1987 and 1988.

External links

1958 births
Living people
Ugandan male sprinters
Athletes (track and field) at the 1984 Summer Olympics
Olympic athletes of Uganda
World Athletics Championships athletes for Uganda
20th-century Ugandan people
21st-century Ugandan people